Javier Eduardo López Ramírez (born 17 September 1994), also known as "La Chofis", is a Mexican professional footballer who plays as an attacking midfielder for Liga MX club Pachuca.

Club career

Youth career
López started his youth career in the soccer academy Centro de Sinergia Futbolística (CESIFUT) based in Lerdo, Durango.

Guadalajara
López made his professional debut on 24 February 2013 against León.

Following an injury that left him out for a couple of weeks, he scored his first Liga MX goals against Monterrey on 19 March 2016, scoring a brace. In January 2019 López had an operation on his knee. He returned in late March during a friendly game against Zacatepec in a 2–0 win with Lopez scoring the first goal.

On 5 November 2020, López was suspended by Guadalajara due to an allegation of sexual abuse made against teammate Dieter Villalpando at a party that was also attended by López and three other teammates.

San Jose Earthquakes
On 20 January 2021, López signed on loan with Major League Soccer side San Jose Earthquakes, joining his former coach Matias Almeyda. López earned the MLS Player of the Month award for September 2021, scoring six goals and one assist in six matches during the month. López was named among the three finalists for the 2021 MLS Newcomer of the Year Award. He ultimately would lose the award to Los Angeles FC forward Cristian Arango. In late November 2021 it was reported that López had signed a six-month contract extension that would see him continue with San Jose through June 2022. On 4 July 2022, the Earthquakes announced that López had concluded his 18-month loan with the club and would return to Guadalajara.

Pachuca
On 18 July 2022, López joined Pachuca on a permanent transfer from Guadalajara. On 30 October 2022, Lopez won his second ever Liga MX championship and his first with Pachuca.

Personal life
His younger brother, Brayam was also a footballer who played as a midfielder for Guadalajara's U-20 team. López has stated in interviews that he does not like his first name, and prefers to be called by his middle name.

He is nicknamed La Chofis because teammates pointed out that López looked like former teammate Giovani Casillas' ex-girlfriend named Sofia.

Honours
Guadalajara
Liga MX: Clausura 2017
Copa MX: Apertura 2015, Clausura 2017
Supercopa MX: 2016
CONCACAF Champions League: 2018

Pachuca
Liga MX: Apertura 2022

References

1994 births
Living people
Footballers from Coahuila
Mexican footballers
Sportspeople from Torreón
Association football midfielders
C.D. Guadalajara footballers
Liga MX players
San Jose Earthquakes players
Major League Soccer players
Designated Players (MLS)